Coleophora sobria is a moth of the family Coleophoridae.

References

sobria
Moths described in 1994